San Pedro La Laguna is a Guatemalan town on the southwest shore of Lake Atitlán. For centuries, San Pedro La Laguna has been inhabited by the Tz'utujil people, and in recent years it has also become a tourist destination for its Spanish language schools, nightlife, and proximity to the lake and volcanoes.

Local crops include corn, beans, coffee, and avocado. Some women make belts, shawls, and skirts with a back strap loom. San Pedro graduates large numbers of teachers who work the Atitlán area. Activities for tourists include hikes to the top of the San Pedro volcano or the Mayan Face, studying Spanish, partying in the restaurant sector down by the lakeshore, volunteering, and learning local crafts.

Geography 
San Pedro La Laguna is located on the southwestern shore of Lago de Atitlán. The town is located beneath Volcan San Pedro. This volcano towers over the lake at 9,905 feet and is an attraction for climbers and hikers. The town of San Pedro La Laguna sits on a plateau and has roads running down either side of a steep ridge towards docks on the lakeshore. The dock on the west side of the plateau is called muelle municipal and has boats arriving from and departing to the town of Panajachel. The east side has a dock named muelle santiago which has boats arriving from and departing to Santiago Atitlan. The east side is also home to la playa (the beach) where people enjoy snorkeling, canoeing, and kayaking.

San Pedro La Laguna can be reached by regular boats across Lake Atitlán from Panajachel (45 min) and Santiago Atitlán (30 min), or by direct bus from Guatemala City (4 hrs), Xela (3 hrs), and Mazatenango. The town is located one hour off the Interamericana Highway (CA-1) at km 148. Buses for San Pedro depart hourly from zone 8, near the Trébol interchange, alongside Calzada Roosvelt in Guatemala City or, in Xela, from the main bus terminal in zone 3.

Demography 

San Pedro La Laguna is a small town with a population of approximately 13,000 people. The inhabitants of San Pedro are primarily Tz'utujil Maya, with a small, but growing, expatriate community. The population is over 90 percent indigenous.  The expatriate community that is forming within San Pedro La Laguna is composed of Americans and Europeans.

Religion 

The religion that is the most dominant in San Pedro La Laguna is Roman Catholicism. This has been the most dominant religion since the 16th century, when the Spaniards colonized Guatemala.

While Guatemala was under a brutal military regime the North American Protestant Evangelical churches were allowed to enter into any community.  As a result of Protestant evangelism, more than 40% of Pedranos are now Evangelical.

Although the Protestant and Catholic religions have been dominant for many years, about half of the population still practices traditional Maya rituals either separately or alongside another religion. Many locals believe the world is inhabited by both good and bad spirits that influence many aspects of daily life. Xocomil, a wind coming from the south that "carries away sin", usually visits Lake Atitlán area around midday. If the wind is coming from the north, the Maya claim, the lake's spirit is getting rid of a person who has drowned after claiming his or her soul.

In 2010, due to an influx of Jewish tourists from Israel and North America, a synagogue and kosher restaurant were opened by Chabad. Today, many Jewish tourists can be seen in the streets of San Pedro La Laguna, and many stores have hebrew advertising on them. Warm ties between the local and Jewish Communities have been reported. Two eye witnesses heard multiple local community members shouting the word "elokut" on Saturday, February 15, which translates to "godliness" in Hebrew. Synagogue services in San Pedro La Laguna occur every Saturday with a Minyan along with shabbat meals.

Government 

San Pedro La Laguna is in the Sololá department of Guatemala. San Pedro La Laguna is separated into four cantons: Pacucha, Chuacante, Chuasanahi, and Tzanjay.

During the last two years, San Pedro La Laguna passed a town ordinance to ban the use of plastic, which includes straws and plastic bags. The citizens have opted to utilize readily made textiles, baskets, etc. for daily use during their shopping trips. It is evident, that may are doing their part without pay, as part of their effort, long time citizens take trips on their canoes to extract some 700 lbs. of trash from their lake each day. Residents have complained of contamination in the lake, possibly caused by pollution, increased population, tourism, and cyanotoxin, a bacterium which has substantially increased since 2009.

Customs 
Museo Tz'unun 'Ya is a museum documenting local history and customs, including the formation of the lake and colorized photos of pre-Civil War San Pedro La Laguna. Indigenous medical traditions are still commonly practiced by healers, known as curanderos.

History

Civil War
The Guatemalan Civil War spanned the years from 1960 to 1996. During this time San Pedro La Laguna remained relatively unaffected and unharmed by the surrounding violence. However, from the years of 1980 to 1982 there was a series of kidnappings and murders in the community. It became known that the local military commissioners were behind these actions. It was alleged that villagers were blacklisted for disloyalty to the army or for suspicion of collaborating with guerrillas, and military commissioners placed guerrilla type leaflets and graffiti around the village at night to support the allegations. This continued for nearly two years until August 1982, when higher military officials intervened. After their removal, calm was restored.

Gallery

References

External links 

Website of San Pedro La Laguna
Anthropologist's Blog about learning Tz'utujil in San Pedro La Laguna
Video about historic Mayan site, La Nariz, near San Pedro La Laguna
Demonstration of Tz'utujil Mayan Language, spoken in San Pedro la Laguna
Video de San Pedro La Laguna

Municipalities of the Sololá Department
Articles containing video clips